Dmitri Grents (born 10 June 1996) is a Kazakhstani ice hockey centre playing for Torpedo Ust-Kamenogorsk in the Supreme Hockey League (VHL) an affiliate to former club, Barys Astana of the Kontinental Hockey League.

References

External links

1996 births
Living people
Kazakhstani ice hockey centres
Barys Nur-Sultan players
Nomad Astana players
Asian Games gold medalists for Kazakhstan
Medalists at the 2017 Asian Winter Games
Asian Games medalists in ice hockey
Ice hockey players at the 2017 Asian Winter Games
Competitors at the 2017 Winter Universiade
Universiade medalists in ice hockey
Universiade silver medalists for Kazakhstan
Sportspeople from Oskemen